Leslyn Lewis  (born December 2, 1970) is a Canadian lawyer and politician who has served as the member of Parliament (MP) for Haldimand—Norfolk since 2021. A member of the Conservative Party, Lewis contested the party leadership in the 2020 leadership election, placing third. She was the first visible minority woman to run for the federal Conservative Party leadership. Lewis was also a candidate in the 2022 Conservative leadership election, coming in third overall. She is known for her socially conservative views.

Early life and education
Born in Jamaica, she immigrated to Canada at age five and grew up in East York, Ontario.

Lewis graduated with a Bachelor of Arts with high distinction from the University of Toronto as a student of Trinity College. She also holds a Master of Environmental Studies from York University with a concentration in business and environment from the Schulich School of Business, and a law degree and PhD in international law from Osgoode Hall Law School.

Legal career
Lewis has practiced law since approximately 2000 and is the managing partner of Lewis Law in Scarborough, specializing in commercial litigation and international trade practice, with a focus on energy policy. She has hosted the television show Law Matters.

In 2018 she was appointed by the province of Ontario to the board of the Ontario Trillium Foundation and was later named to the foundation's committee responsible for dispensing funds for youth programs.

In May 2019 she was awarded a Harry Jerome Award for Professional Excellence by the Black Business and Professional Association.

Politics

2015 federal election
Lewis began her political career in the riding of Markham—Stouffville, where she was vice president and a primary fundraiser of the Conservative electoral district association while Paul Calandra was MP.

In the 2015 federal election Conservative leader Stephen Harper appointed her as a replacement candidate to run the riding of Scarborough—Rouge Park only a few weeks before the vote after the previous Conservative candidate had been forced to withdraw following a scandal. An article in the National Post referred to Lewis as a “high-quality substitute". She placed second to Liberal candidate Gary Anandasangaree, receiving 13,587 votes.

2020 Conservative Party leadership candidate

In February 2020, Lewis was confirmed as an official leadership contestant for the Conservative Party of Canada, following the resignation of Andrew Scheer as leader in December 2019. Had she been successful, she would have been the first visible minority woman to lead any of the three major federal Canadian parties.

Her platform was described as socially conservative. While she considers conversion therapy "an atrocious thing", she raised concerns about the Canadian government's proposed ban, citing an unclear definition that risks penalizing conversations with parents or religious leaders. She stated that while she personally defines marriage as between a man and a woman, she would not roll back existing legislation redefining marriage in Canada.  She has stated that she would like to make marijuana access more restrictive and that she thinks reactions to climate change are overblown "in some respects". She has publicly described herself as "pro-life, no hidden agenda" and as leader would have the Conservative Party move to ban sex-selective abortion and coerced abortion, increase government funding for crisis pregnancy centres (which provide alternatives to abortion), and she would end foreign aid funding for abortion. Her candidacy has been endorsed by anti-abortion advocacy groups including the Campaign Life Coalition.

She opposed carbon taxes and supports promoting green technology as an alternative policy.

Despite Lewis leading the second ballot on the popular vote, she was eliminated after placing third in points.

2021 federal election and 44th Parliament
On August 25, 2020, Lewis announced that she would be running for a seat in the House of Commons in an undisclosed riding in the 2021 Canadian federal election. On September 15, 2020, she formally announced that she would be seeking the Conservative nomination in Haldimand—Norfolk. She was acclaimed as the Conservative candidate in the riding the next month. On September 20, 2021, Lewis won the seat for the Conservative Party in the 2021 Canadian federal election.

Following the election, Lewis stated her opposition to COVID-19 vaccine mandates for MPs and questioned COVID-19 vaccines for children. Her position may have caused her to be omitted from the Conservative shadow cabinet. As CBC reported the matter, "Notably absent from the critics' list are MPs who have voiced opposition to COVID-19 vaccine policies."

2022 Conservative Party leadership candidate

Lewis announced on March 8, 2022, that she would again run for the leadership of the Conservative Party. Lewis ran on a similar campaign agenda, championing socially conservative causes like a ban on sex-selective abortion and coerced abortion, providing funding for crisis pregnancy centres and ending the oversees funding of abortions. On September 10, 2022, Lewis lost to Carleton MP Pierre Poilievre on the first ballot, garnering 9.69% of the vote.

Infrastructure Critic 
In October 2022, Lewis was appointed to Poilievre's shadow cabinet as infrastructure critic.

2023 Meeting with German Politician 
In February 2023, Lewis, along with fellow Conservative MPs Colin Carrie and Dean Allison, had dinner with Christine Anderson, a Member of the European Parliament representing Alternative for Germany, who was on a Canadian tour of right-wing media and convoy protest supporters. The meeting was condemned by the Centre for Israel and Jewish Affairs, the Canadian Anti-Hate Network, and Prime Minister Justin Trudeau among others, for Anderson and AfD's Islamophobic and antisemitic positions. Conservative leader Pierre Poilievre also denounced Anderson's views as "vile", racist, and said that "it would be better if Anderson never visited Canada in the first place". The three MPs released a joint-statement saying that while meetings with foreign elected officials are ordinary, they were unaware of her or her party's views, and that they condemned racist and hateful views. Christine Anderson has, however, denied Conservative Leader Pierre Poilievre’s claim that the three Conservtive MPs involved had no information about her politics before they met her. Lewis harshly responded to the criticism in an article published in the Toronto Sun.

Electoral record

Notes

References

External links 

 

1970 births
Living people
University of Toronto alumni
Jamaican emigrants to Canada
Canadian anti-abortion activists
Canadian Pentecostals
Black Canadian politicians
Black Canadian women
Lawyers in Ontario
21st-century Canadian lawyers
Conservative Party of Canada MPs
21st-century Canadian politicians
21st-century Canadian women politicians
Members of the House of Commons of Canada from Ontario
Women members of the House of Commons of Canada